Tout, tout de suite is a 2016 crime thriller-drama film directed by Richard Berry. The film is a co-production between France, Luxembourg and Belgium. Written by Richard Berry and Morgan Sportès, it is based on a novel by Sportès which was in turn inspired by the events of the Affair of the Gang of Barbarians in 2006. The film was released on 11 May 2016.

Cast 
 Marc Ruchmann as Ilan Halimi
 Steve Achiepo as Youssouf Fofana
 Romane Rauss as Zelda
 Richard Berry as Didier Halimi
 Idit Cebula as Judith Halimi
 Pascale Louange as psychologist
 Morgane Nairaud as Agnès
 Hedi Bouchenafa as sniper
 Matila Malliarakis as Suze
 Djibril Gueye as Cappuccino

References

External links 
 

2016 films
2016 crime drama films
2016 crime thriller films
2010s French-language films
French drama films
French crime thriller films
Belgian crime drama films
Luxembourgian drama films
Films directed by Richard Berry
French nonlinear narrative films
Films about kidnapping
Films based on French novels
French films based on actual events
Films produced by Thomas Langmann
French-language Belgian films
2010s French films